Arbroath Lady Loan railway station served the town of Arbroath, Angus, Scotland from 1838 to 1848 on the Dundee and Arbroath Railway.

History 
The station opened on 8 October 1838 on the Dundee and Arbroath Railway. It was situated west of the harbour, which opened a year later. It had a locomotive shed and a turntable. The tramway that it used couldn't be upgraded to a railway so it closed when the new Arbroath station opened on 1 February 1848.

References

External links 

Disused railway stations in Angus, Scotland
Railway stations in Great Britain opened in 1838
Railway stations in Great Britain closed in 1848
1838 establishments in Scotland
1848 disestablishments in Scotland
Former Dundee and Arbroath Railway stations